Snake Party (also called Snake's Head Movement or Harakat Ras Al Afa) is composed substantially of former Baath Party and Saddam Hussein loyalists that are engaged in the Iraqi insurgency. This group originated from the Ba’ath Party in Hawija and aspired to be a political party to oppose the multinational forces' presence in Iraq. Some have alleged that the party has links to tribes around Falluja and Ramadi. Al-Ahram reported in 2003 that the organization was one of several that target those who collaborate with occupation forces.

Criticism
Some call the Snake Party fanatics and Arab Sunni street gangs. Supporters of the Snake Party say it is an organized and legitimate paramilitary movement.

References

Ba'ath Party breakaway groups
Ba'athist organizations
Iraqi insurgency (2003–2011)
Organizations associated with the Ba'ath Party
Rebel groups in Iraq